Keith Malcolm Petyt   (born February 1941) is a sociolinguist and historian.

As a native of Bradford, he investigated the speech of West Yorkshire in his early work.  His first publication, Emily Brontë and the Haworth Dialect, compared the speech of the servant Joseph in Wuthering Heights with information on the Haworth dialect from two informants.

He was one of the first to apply Labovian methods in Britain with his research in 1970–1 on the speech of Bradford, Halifax and Huddersfield.  He concluded that the speech detailed in most of dialectology (e.g. A. J. Ellis, the Survey of English Dialects) had virtually disappeared, having found only one speaker out of his sample of 106 speakers who regularly used dialect.  However, he found that differences in speech persisted as an indicator of social class, age and gender.  This PhD dissertation was later adapted into a book, Dialect and Accent in Industrial West Yorkshire.  The work was criticised by Graham Shorrocks on the grounds that the sociolinguistic methods used were inappropriate for recording the traditional vernacular and that there was an inadequate basis for comparison with earlier dialect studies in West Yorkshire.

His 1980 book The study of dialect: an introduction to dialectology was a critical history of dialect studies.  He also wrote a generally positive review of the very successful textbook Accents of English by John C. Wells.

After a brief appointment art University College Cardiff in the early 1960s, Petyt spent most of his professional career at the University of Reading, lecturing in linguistic science. Later in his career, he published the book The Growth of Reading in 1993.

He retired to the Yorkshire Dales and wrote a review of dialect studies in the Sedburgh area in 2014, which he donated to both the Sedbergh and District History Society and the Yorkshire Dialect Society.  He is currently the Yorkshire Dales National Park's Member Champion for Recreation Management and is a vice president and former Chairman of the Yorkshire Dales Society.

References

Linguists from England
Writers from Bradford
Sociolinguists
Dialectologists
Living people
1941 births